John Doolan (born 10 November 1968) is an English football player and coach. He is currently the First Team Coach at Accrington Stanley.

Born in Liverpool, he played for Wigan Athletic between 1992 and 1996. Having worked at both Liverpool and Everton Academies He was appointed as Wigan's youth team coach in November 2011, following the departure of Dave Watson. In December 2013, Doolan joined the first team coaching staff following the arrival of Uwe Rosler the club made the playoffs and reached the semifinal of the F.A Cup losing to Arsenal on penalties.

In July 2014, he moved to Scottish club Hibernian as first team coach. Lifting the Scottish Cup in a 3-2 win against Rangers.

On 1 June 2016, he and Hibs manager Alan Stubbs moved to Rotherham United. Following a poor run of form, Stubbs was sacked by Rotherham on 19 October 2016 and Doolan also left the club.

In July 2017, he returned to his former club Accrington as the first team coach. Doolan helped them win promotion from EFL League Two going up as Champions in his first season back.

References

External links
 

1968 births
Living people
Footballers from Liverpool
English footballers
Association football defenders
Mossley A.F.C. players
Wigan Athletic F.C. players
English Football League players
Barrow A.F.C. players
Ashton United F.C. players
Accrington Stanley F.C. players
Knowsley United F.C. players
Everton F.C. non-playing staff
Liverpool F.C. non-playing staff
Wigan Athletic F.C. non-playing staff
Hibernian F.C. non-playing staff
Accrington Stanley F.C. non-playing staff